Max Reger's 1915 Requiem (or the Hebbel Requiem), is a late Romantic setting of Friedrich Hebbel's poem "Requiem" for alto or baritone solo, chorus and orchestra.

Reger had composed Requiem settings before: his 1912 motet for male chorus, published as the final part of his , uses the same poem, and in 1914 he set out to compose a choral work in memory of the victims of the Great War.

The Hebbel Requiem was published by N. Simrock in 1916, after the composer's death, with another choral composition,  (The Hermit), to a poem by Joseph von Eichendorff. That  publication was titled  (Two songs for mixed chorus with orchestra), . Reger provided a piano transcription of the orchestral parts. Max Beckschäfer arranged the work for voice, chorus and organ in 1985. The Hebbel Requiem was first performed in Heidelberg on 16July 1916 as part of a memorial concert for Reger, conducted by Philipp Wolfrum.

Reger thought the Hebbel Requiem was "among the most beautiful things" he ever wrote. It has been described as of "lyrical beauty, a dramatic compactness, and [of] economy of musical means" in which the composer's "mastery of impulse, technique, and material is apparent".

Background 
Reger was a German composer, born in Brand in 1873 and raised in Weiden in der Oberpfalz. He studied music theory from April to July 1890 with Hugo Riemann at the royal conservatory in Sondershausen and continued his studies, in piano and theory, at the Wiesbaden Conservatory beginning in September of that year. He established himself as a keyboard composer, performer, and teacher of piano and organ. The first compositions to which he assigned opus numbers were chamber music. In 1891 he composed his Sechs Lieder, Op. 4, a collection of six songs. The first, "" (Prayer), was on a text by Friedrich Hebbel, who also wrote the poem on which two of Reger's Requiem settings are based.

Reger returned to his parental home in 1898, where he composed his first work for choir and orchestra,  (Hymn to song), Op. 21. He moved to Munich in 1901. Income from publishers, concerts and private teaching enabled him to marry in 1902. His wife, Elsa vonBercken, was a divorced Protestant, and as a result he was excommunicated from the Catholic Church. In 1907 he was appointed musical director at Leipzig University and professor at the Royal Conservatory in Leipzig.

In 1911 Reger was appointed Hofkapellmeister (music director) at the court of Duke Georg II of Saxe-Meiningen, while retaining his professorial duties at the Leipzig conservatory. In 1912 he set Hebbel's poem "Requiem" as a motet for unaccompanied male choir, which was published as No.10 of his collection Op. 83. In 1913 he composed four tone poems on paintings by Arnold Böcklin (Vier Tondichtungen nach A. Böcklin), including the painting Die Toteninsel (Isle of the Dead), as his Op. 128. He gave up the court position in 1914 for health reasons. That year, in response to the World War, he set out to compose a choral work to commemorate the soldiers who had died or were mortally wounded. He began to set the Latin Requiem but abandoned the work as a fragment. In 1915 he moved to Jena but continued teaching in Leipzig. In Jena, he composed the Hebbel Requiem for soloist, choir and orchestra, Op.144b, again on Hebbel's poem, as in the setting for men's chorus. Following a full day of teaching in Leipzig, Reger died of a heart attack while staying at a hotel there on 11May 1916.

Hebbel's poem 

In 1840 the playwright Friedrich Hebbel wrote a poem in German titled "Requiem", its Latin title alluding to "" (eternal rest), the first words of the Mass for the Dead. The poem opens with an apostrophe to a "soul" in a plea, "" (Soul, forget them not, soul, forget not the dead). These words appear to echo various psalms, such as Psalm 103, "Bless the Lord, O my soul". Hebbel, however, evokes an "eternal rest" that is distinctly non-religious: the poem offers no metaphysical reference, Christian or otherwise, but calls for remembrance as the only way to keep the dead alive. The first lines, in which the speaker calls upon the soul not to forget the dead, are repeated in the centre of the poem and again at its conclusion, as a refrain that sets apart two longer sections of verse. The first of these sections describes how the dead, nurtured by love, enjoy a final glow of life. In contrast, the latter section portrays a different fate for souls that have been forsaken: who are relegated to an unending, desolate struggle for renewed existence. The musicologist Katherine FitzGibbon notes that the speaker of this narrative is not identified, but may be "a poetic narrator, divine voice, or even the dead".

The poem was published in 1857. Separately, Peter Cornelius set the same poem in 1863, as a funeral motet for a six-part chorus, in response to the author's death.

Motet 

Reger composed his first setting of Hebbel's poem as a motet for unaccompanied male choir in 1912 in Meiningen, where he had worked from 1911. He composed it for the Basler Liedertafel, conducted by Hermann Suter, who performed it on 18May 1912 to celebrate their 60th anniversary before giving the official premiere at the national Schweizer Eidgenössisches Sängerfest (Swiss federal song festival) in Neuchâtel on 22July 1912.

In accordance with the poem's structure, Reger used the same material for each of the refrains, in a homophonic setting. The words "ihr verglimmendes Leben" (their dimming life) are illustrated by "a sequence of chromatically descending sixth chords". Similar descending chords are often found in Reger's works as a musical expression of "pain, fear, death, and suffering—common associations with chromaticism since the sixteenth century", according to FitzGibbon. Both the recurring refrain and the descending chords reappear in the later setting of the poem in the Hebbel Requiem.

Lateinisches Requiem 

After the outbreak of war, Reger intended to compose a work commemorating the soldiers who had died or were mortally wounded, a choral work of "" (in great style). By the autumn of 1914, he was in discussion with a theologian in Giessen about a composition, tentatively titled ""  Last Things [Final Judgment and Resurrection])". The organist Karl Straube, who had premiered several of Reger's organ works, recommended that Reger compose the traditional Latin Requiem instead, because  would only be a variation on Ein deutsches Requiem by Johannes Brahms. Following his advice, Reger managed the composition of the introit and Kyrie, combining both texts into one movement. He announced the project, a composition for soloists, chorus, orchestra and organ, to his publisher on 3October 1914. The Dies irae remained unfinished. Reger wrote to Fritz Stein, his friend and later biographer, that he was in the middle of its composition, but had been interrupted after the line "statuens in parte dextra".

The Lateinisches Requiem is scored for soloists (soprano, alto, tenor, bass), a four-part (SATB) choir, three flutes (also piccolo), two oboes, cor anglais, two clarinets, two bassoons, contrabassoon, four horns, three trumpets, three trombones, tuba, three percussionists and strings. It is Reger's only choral composition to use four soloists. The four "" are used like the several choirs in compositions by Heinrich Schütz. The first movement opens with a long organ pedal point, which has been compared to the beginning of Wagner's Das Rheingold and the Brahms Requiem.

The music was first performed by Stein in Berlin on 28May 1938 with four soloists and the enlarged choir of the Musikhochschule Berlin. For this performance, the liturgical Latin text was replaced by a German text, adapted to suit Nazi ideology. Hellmut von Hase titled his text  (Rite of the Dead) and managed to serve "the Nazi adulation of the fallen war hero" (as FitzGibbon said), dropping references to the bible. He replaced for example "" (Hear my prayer; to you shall all flesh come) by "In sorrow we mutely lower the flags, for into the grave sunk what was dear to us." This version was published in 1939 by the Max Reger Society.

The unfinished Dies irae was published in 1974 and first performed in Hamburg's St. Jakobi on 3November 1979 by Yoko Kawahara, Marga Höffgen, Hans-Dieter Bader, Nikolaus Hillebrand, the NDR Chor and NDR Sinfonieorchester, conducted by Roland Bader.

The Lateinisches Requiem is officially catalogued as WoOV/9.

Hebbel Requiem

History 
Johannes Brahms, in his  (A German Requiem), had already opened the way for the composition of a non-liturgical Requiem, written in a language other than Latin while still addressing the traditional theme of rest (requies)  for the dead. In this tradition, Reger's 1915 Requiem, is also not a setting of the Requiem in Latin, but of Hebbel's poem. He composed it in Jena, a year before his own death, this time for a solo voice (alto or baritone), chorus and orchestra. Reger titled the autograph of the piano version: 
 /  Requiem / (Hebbel), and he wrote the dedication: "." (To the memory of the German heroes who fell in the War 1914/15).

Reger completed the composition on 25August 1915. He wrote to the publisher  on : "I've finished two choral works (Der Einsiedler and Requiem). I think I can safely say that they're both among the most beautiful things I've ever written." (Ich habe nun zwei Chorwerke (Der Einsiedler und Requiem) fertig. Ich glaube sagen zu dürfen, daß diese beiden Chorwerke mit das Schönste sind, was ich je geschrieben habe.) Simrock also published a vocal score as prepared by Reger himself.

The Hebbel Requiem was first performed, together with Der Einsiedler, in Heidelberg on 16July 1916, after the composer's death, as part of a memorial concert for Reger, featuring Eva Katharina Lissmann, the choirs Bachverein and Akademischer Gesangverein, and the enlarged Städtisches Orchester (Municipal Orchestra), conducted by Philipp Wolfrum.

In 1925 the Requiem was published in Vienna as a pocket score, Philharmonia-Taschenpartitur No.284. Edition Peters published it in 1928, stating the performance duration as 25minutes, although the duration implied by the metronome marking is 14minutes.

Music

Structure 
Reger's Hebbel Requiem is in one movement. It follows the overall form of the narrated poem, but with variations, resulting in a structure of different moods. The beginning is recalled in the middle and at the end. The following table is based on the score and on an analysis by Katherine FitzGibbon. The translation of the incipits is given as in the liner notes of the 2009 recording in the translation by Richard Stokes. The four-part SATB chorus is often divided. The work is in D minor and common time. The tempo marking is Molto sostenuto, and is sustained with only slight modifications (stringendo and ritardando) until the most dramatic section, marked Più mosso (faster) and later Allegro, returning to the initial tempo for the conclusion.

Sections

A 
The short instrumental introduction is based on a pedal point sustained for several measures, reminiscent of pedal points in funeral music by Schütz and Bach, in Mozart's Requiem in the same key of D minor, and in Reger's previous Latin Requiem. In a pattern similar to the beginning of A German Requiem, the bass notes are repeated, here on a low D (D1).

The soloist alone sings the intimate appellation "" (Soul, forget them not) on a simple melody and repeating the first line after the second. Throughout the piece the soloist sings only these words, in the beginning and in the repeats. The chorus, here divided in eight parts, evokes the start of the spiritual ascent, "" (See, they hover around you, shuddering, abandoned), in mostly homophonic chords, marked ppp, in a fashion reminiscent of Schütz.

B 
In section B, "" (and in the holy glowing), the pedal point ends. The chorus is divided in four to six parts, in more independent motion. As in works by Schütz, two or three voices often introduce new text.

A' 
The soloist sings the recapitulation of the beginning similar to the first time, again on the pedal point, but repeats the second line one more time, while the chorus sings about the hovering, as before.

C 
In section C, "" (and if you coldly close yourself to them, they stiffen), Reger uses word painting, by means of downward lines and a final decrescendo for the line "erstarren sie bis hinein in das Tiefste" (they stiffen, up to the deepest). On the word "" (stiffens), the chorus settles on a dissonant 5-part chord, held for two measures, suddenly fortissimo with a crescendo at the end, then repeated pianissimo, an octave lower, motionless.

In great contrast, in "" (The storm of night then grips them), a storm is depicted in dense motion of four parts imitating a theme in triplets.

A'' 
In the conclusion, the soloist repeats the earlier phrase, but this time the chorus finally joins in the words of the appellation. The soloist introduces a new wording "" (Forget them not, the dead). The chorus repeats this phrase, marked espressivo, dolcissimo, on the melody of the chorale "", five stanzas of which Bach used in his St Matthew Passion. The melody is not repeated as in the original, but continued for half a line. Reger is known for quoting chorales in general and this one in particular, most often referring to its last stanza "", which Bach included in the Passion right after the death of Jesus. The corresponding text would then be "" (When I must depart one day, do not part from me then. When the greatest anxiety ...).

Reger completes the chorale setting for the chorus, without further reference to the chorale melody, while the solo voice repeats at the same time ", concluding with descending tones of more than anoctave.

Scoring and performances 
The Requiem employs an orchestra of two flutes, piccolo, two oboes, cor anglais, two clarinets, two bassoons, four horns, three trumpets, three trombones, tuba, three percussionists and strings. It requires a chorus to match. Reger himself wrote a version for piano.

To make the music more accessible, the composer and organist Max Beckschäfer arranged the work for voice, chorus and organ in 1985. The organ version was premiered in the Marktkirche in Wiesbaden, where Reger had played the organ himself when he studied there in the 1890s. Gabriel Dessauer conducted a project choir, later known as the Reger-Chor. Beckschäfer was the organist, Ulrike Buchs the vocal soloist. The choir, expanded into the Reger-Chor-International by singers from Belgium, performed the work again in 2001 with organist Ignace Michiels from St. Salvator's Cathedral, Bruges, both there and in St. Bonifatius, Wiesbaden (recorded live). They performed it a third time in 2010 to celebrate the 25th anniversary of the Reger-Chor.

The Hebbel Requiem was performed as part of the Ouverture spirituelle of the 2014 Salzburg Festival, along with Bruckner's Fourth Symphony, with Plácido Domingo as baritone soloist and the Vienna Philharmonic conducted by Daniel Barenboim.

2016 
To mark the centenary of Reger's death in 2016, the broadcaster Bayerischer Rundfunk staged a concert of the Hebbel Requiem in early May, conducted by Karl-Heinz Steffens. The Bachfest Leipzig 2016 programmed several works by Reger, including the Latin Requiem fragment in the opening concert at the Thomaskirche on 10 June, and the Hebbel Requiem there on 17 June, along with Der Mensch lebt und bestehet and O Tod, wie bitter bist du.

Evaluation 
In a review of a recording of choral works by Reger, Gavin Dixon said that the Requiem is "almost mystical in its use of widely spaced chords, unusual harmonic shifts and dreamy arpeggios in the accompaniment". The program notes for the recording say that in the "anguished, expressionistic evocation of the 'shuddering', 'forsaken', 'cold' souls, the piece seems determined to expose death in all its grim horror".

Debra Lenssen wrote in her 2002 thesis about Reger's :

Recordings

References

Bibliography

Scores

Max-Reger-Institute

Books

Journals

Newspapers

Online sources

External links 
 Johann Baptiste Maximilian Reger, Requiem Survey
 Entries for the Requiem,  on WorldCat
 
 

1915 compositions
Compositions by Max Reger
Compositions in D minor
Reger
World War I in popular culture